Timothy Gregory Swiel (born 4 June 1993) is an English-born South African rugby union player for the Western Province in the currie cup and the DHL Stormers in super rugby in South Africa. His regular position is fly-half.

Career

Youth

Swiel attended Bishops in Cape Town and played in their first side in 2010 and 2011 alongside Oli Kebble and Johnny Kôtze. As part of an exchange programme, Swiel also played for English school side Dulwich College during the 2010–2011 season.

Swiel represented  at Under-16 level at the 2009 Grant Khomo Week and at Under-18 level at the 2010 Academy Week and 2011 Craven Week tournaments, leading to his inclusion in the South Africa Schools side in 2011.

Swiel also played for the  team in the 2012 Under-21 Provincial Championship – scoring 81 points to finish joint seventh in the scoring charts – and 2013 Under-21 Provincial Championship competitions – scoring 180 points including 5 tries.

Western Province

His senior debut came during the 2013 Vodacom Cup competition, coming on as a substitute in  17–17 draw against  in Ceres. Seven more appearances followed in that competition.

Sharks

Swiel was also included in the  squad for the 2014 Super Rugby season. He scored his first points in Super Rugby just three minutes after coming on, converting a Willem Alberts try.

In September 2014, Swiel made his Currie Cup debut, playing off the bench in their match against . In addition to his three Currie Cup appearances, he also played for the  side on six occasions during the 2014 Under-21 Provincial Championship, scoring 38 points.

Harlequins

In October 2014, English Premiership side Harlequins signed Swiel as short-term injury cover for Ben Botica.

Swiel made his debut for Harlequins in their LV= Cup match against Saracens, coming on as a second-half substitute. He made his starting debut a week later against the Newport Gwent Dragons in the same competition. After making his Premiership debut against Bath, he also made his debut in the European Rugby Champions Cup, playing in both legs against Irish side Leinster, as they finished third and failed to qualify for the knockout stage.

Swiel made a total of ten appearances for Harlequins during his loan spell – starting five of those matches – and scored 75 points before returning to the Sharks before Round Three of the 2015 Super Rugby season.

In April 2015, Harlequins announced that Swiel would return to the club on a full-time deal for the 2015–2016 season.

Newcastle Falcons

In 2018, Swiel signs for Premiership rivals Newcastle Falcons ahead of the 2018-19 season.

Stormers
On 26 May 2020, Swiel returns to South Africa to sign for Stormers.

Representative rugby

In addition to being included in the South Africa Schools side in 2011, he was also included in a South Africa Under-20 training squad, but later ruled himself out of selection for the 2013 IRB Junior World Championship. Under IRB rules, playing for the S.A. Under-20 team would have made him ineligible to play for another international team, but as a British passport holder, Swiel wanted to keep his options open and did not yet want to commit his long-term international future to South Africa.

References

South African rugby union players
Living people
1993 births
Rugby union players from Taunton
Western Province (rugby union) players
Sharks (Currie Cup) players
Sharks (rugby union) players
Harlequin F.C. players
Rugby union fly-halves
Rugby union fullbacks
Newcastle Falcons players
Stormers players
Toyota Industries Shuttles Aichi players